BPEA may refer to:

 9,10-Bis(phenylethynyl)anthracene
 Baring Private Equity Asia
 Brookings Papers on Economic Activity
 Bureau Permanent d’Enquêtes d’Accidents et Incidents d’Aviation